Taken Down, is an Irish crime drama series starring Aissa Maiga, Lynn Rafferty, Brian Gleeson, Orla Fitzgerald and Barry Ward. It ran for one season on RTÉ2.

The series follows Inspector Jen Rooney (Lynn Rafferty) and her team investigating the refugee community after a Nigerian girl is killed.

Reception
The Irish Times called the series a "solemn drama".

References

External links

RTÉ original programming
2018 Irish television series debuts